This is a list of television series in the comedy drama (aka dramedy) genre.

A

A Bit of a Do
A Series of Unfortunate Events
Adventure Time
The Adventures of Tintin
After Life
Agatha Raisin
Agent Anna
Alfred J. Kwak
All in the Family
Ally McBeal
Amphibia
The Almighty Johnsons
Andi Mack
Anne of Green Gables: The Animated Series
Angel
Angel Beats!
Archie Bunker's Place 
Arthur
As If
As Told by Ginger
A Tale Dark & Grimm
At Home with the Braithwaites
Atlanta
A Touch of Frost
Atypical
Auf Wiedersehen, Pet
Avatar: The Last Airbender
Awkward.

B

Ballers
The Baker & the Beauty
Bakuman
Barry
Be Cool, Scooby-Doo!
The Beachcombers
Beautiful People
BECK: Mongolian Chop Squad
Being Erica
Ben 10 (2005 TV series)
Ben 10 (2016 TV series)
Ben 10: Alien Force
Ben 10: Omniverse
Ben 10: Ultimate Alien
The Best Laid Plans
The Big C
Big Hero 6: The Series
Blott on the Landscape
Bob & Rose
BoJack Horseman
Boston Legal
Boy Meets Girl
Boy Meets World
The Bradys
Brandy & Mr. Whiskers
Breaker High
Buffy the Vampire Slayer
Bunheads

C

Calimero
Californication
The Carrie Diaries
Castle
Casual
Centaurworld
Charmed
Clone High
Charlotte
Cobra Kai
Codename: Kids Next Door
Cold Feet
Courage the Cowardly Dog
Crashing (American TV series)
Crashing (British TV series)
Crazy Ex-Girlfriend
Cucumber
Cupid

D

Daria
The Darling Buds of May
The Days and Nights of Molly Dodd
Dead End: Paranormal Park
Dead Like Me
Death in Paradise
The Deep
Dragon Ball 
Dragon Ball Z
Dragon Ball GT
The Dragon Prince
Derek
Disenchantment
Desperate Housewives
Devious Maids
Diagnosis: Murder
Diff'rent Strokes
Di-Gata Defenders 
Digimon Adventure
Doc Martin
Doctor Doctor
Dogtanian and the Three Muskehounds
Doogie Howser, M.D.
Double Trouble
Doug
Drop Dead Diva
Drop Dead Weird
Due South
The Dukes of Hazzard
DuckTales (1987 TV series)
DuckTales (2017 TV series)

E

Ed
Eight Is Enough
Entourage
Esper Mami
Eureka

F

Fargo
Father Brown
Felicity
FLCL
Fleabag
Frank's Place
Franklin (TV series)
Franklin & Bash
Freaks and Geeks
Fresh Meat
Faking It
Final Space

G

The Game
GetBackers
Gilmore Girls
Girls
Glee
Go Girls
The Golden Girls
Gravity Falls
Geronimo Stilton
Good Girls
The Good Place
Grace and Frankie
The Greatest American Hero
Greek
Guardians of the Galaxy

H

The Hollow
Hamish Macbeth
Hanazuki: Full of Treasures
Hardball
Hardcastle and McCormick
Harry's Law
Hart of Dixie
Heartbreak High
Hellcats
He's Expecting
Hey Arnold!
Hilda
Home Time
Hooperman
Hotel Babylon
House
House Husbands
House of Lies
How I Met Your Mother
How to Make It in America
Hung

I

I Heart Arlo
I Just Want My Pants Back
I Spy
I'm Dying Up Here
In the Dark
The Inbestigators
Infinity Train
InuYasha
InuYasha: The Final Act
The Irish R.M.
iZombie

J

The Job
Jeeves and Wooster
Jane the Virgin
Jonathan Creek

K

Kentucky Jones
Key West
Kid Cosmic
Kidding
The Kominsky Method
Kuroko's Basketball
Kulipari
Kipo and the Age of Wonderbeasts

L

Las Vegas
The Last Detective
Last Tango in Halifax
The Legend of Korra
Less Than Kind
Life Sentence
Limitless
Linc's
Lilyhammer
Lipstick Jungle
Little Bear (TV series)
Little Lunch
Lockie Leonard
Lois & Clark: The New Adventures of Superman
Looking
The Lone Gunmen
Louie
Love
The Love Boat
Love Live! Sunshine!!
Love Soup
Love, Victor
Lucifer

M

The Marvelous Mrs. Maisel
M*A*S*H
Men in Trees
Men of a Certain Age
Megaman NT Warrior
Metrosexuality
Mighty Morphin Alien Rangers
Mighty Morphin Power Rangers
Mighty Morphin Power Rangers (re-version)
The Mind of the Married Man
Minder
Miraculous Ladybug
Misfits
Monk
Moonlighting
Moral Orel
Mount Pleasant
Mozart in the Jungle
Mustangs FC
Mutual Friends
My Life Is Murder
My Little Pony: Friendship is Magic
Mysticons

N

The New Scooby-Doo Movies
The New Scooby Doo Mysteries
New Tricks
Ninja Turtles: The Next Mutation
No Angels
Noah's Arc
Northern Exposure
Nothing Trivial
Nurse Jackie

O

The O.C.
Offspring
One Day at a Time
One Mississippi
Only Murders in the Building
Orange Is the New Black
Orson and Olivia
The Orville
Oteckovia
Out There
Outrageous Fortune
Over the Garden Wall
The Owl House
The Oz Kids

P

Packed to the Rafters
Parenthood
Passions
The Perils of Penelope Pitstop
Pepper Dennis
Pie in the Sky
Please Like Me
The PM's Daughter
Popular
Power Rangers Beast Morphers
Power Rangers Dino Charge
Power Rangers Dino Fury
Power Rangers Dino Thunder
Power Rangers Jungle Fury
Power Rangers Lightspeed Rescue
Power Rangers Lost Galaxy
Power Rangers Megaforce
Power Rangers Mystic Force
Power Rangers Ninja Steel
Power Rangers Ninja Storm
Power Rangers Operation Overdrive
Power Rangers RPM
Power Rangers Samurai
Power Rangers in Space
Power Rangers S.P.D.
Power Rangers Time Force
Power Rangers Turbo
Power Rangers Wild Force
Power Rangers Zeo
Press Gang
Privileged
Psych
A Pup Named Scooby-Doo
Pushing Daisies

R

The Raccoons
Rake
Red Band Society
Red Oaks
Regular Show
Related
Ren & Stimpy "Adult Party Cartoon"
Remington Steele
Republic of Doyle
Rick and Morty
Rescue Me
Resident Alien
Rise of the Teenage Mutant Ninja Turtles
Rita
Roadies
Robotomy
Roc
Rock & Chips
Roger Roger
Room 222
Royal Pains
RWBY

S

The Saddle Club
Salute Your Shorts
Samurai Champloo
Samurai Jack
Scooby-Doo and Guess Who?
Scooby-Doo: Mystery Incorporated
Scooby-Doo and Scrappy-Doo (1979 TV series)
Scooby-Doo and Scrappy-Doo (1980 TV series)
The Scooby-Doo Show
Scooby-Doo, Where Are You!
Scrubs
Second Generation Wayans
The Secret Life of Us
Seeing Things
Sex and the City
Shaggy & Scooby-Doo Get a Clue!
Shameless (UK TV series)
Shameless (US TV series)
She-Hulk: Attorney at Law
Shell Game
Shirobako
Shirley
Single Ladies
Sirens
Six Feet Under
Skins
The Sleepover Club
Slings and Arrows
The Smith Family
Sonic Prime
The Sopranos
The Spectacular Spider-Man
Spider-Man (1967 TV series)
Spider-Man (1981 TV series)
Spider-Man (1994 TV series)
Spider-Man (2017 TV series)
Spider-Man and His Amazing Friends
Spider-Man: The New Animated Series
Spider-Man Unlimited
Spidey and His Amazing Friends
Sports Night
Star vs. the Forces of Evil 
Stella
Step Dave
Steven Universe
Steven Universe Future 
Stranger Things
Sym-Bionic Titan
Studio 60 on the Sunset Strip
Succession
Sugar Rush
Sunny Piggy

T

Tattingers/Nick & Hillary
The 13 Ghosts of Scooby-Doo
The Legend of Vox Machina
This Is Wonderland
Togetherness
Transparent
Teachers
Teen Titans
Teen Titans Go!
Teenage Mutant Ninja Turtles (1987 TV series)
Teenage Mutant Ninja Turtles (2003 TV series)
Teenage Mutant Ninja Turtles (2012 TV series)
Rise of the Teenage Mutant Ninja Turtles
Tenchi Muyo
This is Us
Turtle's Progress
Tyler Perry's For Better or Worse
Tyler Perry's House of Payne

U

Ugly Betty
Ultimate Spider-Man
Underemployed
Unikitty!
United States
United States of Tara
UnREAL
Unscripted
The Unusuals

V

Valentine
Vanities
Velma
The Venture Bros.
Veronica Mars
Victor and Valentino
A Very Peculiar Practice
V.I.P.

W

WandaVision
Watership Down
Warehouse 13
Watch Your Mouth
We Bare Bears
Wednesday
Weeds
Westside
What About Brian
What's New, Scooby-Doo?
Whiskey Cavalier
Wild Card
The Wild Wild West
The Wild Thornberrys
Wilfred
William and Mary
Window on Main Street
Winx Club
Witches of East End
The Wonder Years
Wonderfalls
World of Winx
Worst Year of My Life Again

Y

You're the Worst
You, Me and the Apocalypse
You Me Her

References

Comedy drama